In the Sun of Marseille (French: Au soleil de Marseille) is a 1938 French musical sports film directed by Pierre-Jean Ducis and starring Henri Garat, Mireille Ponsard and Gorlett. It was one of a cluster of films made with southern French settings during the era.

An operetta film, it portrays the lives of a group of football-loving factory workers who travel to Belgium for a match.

The film's sets were designed by Lucien Jaquelux.

Cast
 Henri Garat as Henri  
 Mireille Ponsard as Mimi Cassis  
 Gorlett as Fenouil  
 Zizi Festerat as Van Meulenbeek  
 Rittche as Sidol  
 Henry as Jef le douanier  
 Mado France as Maricke  
 Henri Vilbert as Marius  
 Charles Lemontier as Le contrôleur  
 Caro Devère as Simone Van Meulenbeek  
 Germaine Sablon as Ginette  
 Fernand Charpin as M. Cassis

References

Bibliography 
 Crisp, Colin. Genre, Myth and Convention in the French Cinema, 1929-1939. Indiana University Press, 2002.

External links 
 

1938 musical films
French musical films
1930s sports films
1938 films
1930s French-language films
Films directed by Pierre-Jean Ducis
Films set in Marseille
Operetta films
French association football films
French black-and-white films
1930s French films